Asterisk indicates Sinn Féin MPs who do not take their seats in the Commons.

See also 
 Election results of women in United Kingdom general elections (1918–1945)
 List of female members of the House of Commons of the United Kingdom
 Mother of Parliament
 Records of members of parliament of the United Kingdom § Women
 Women in the House of Commons of the United Kingdom

References 

Members of the Parliament of the United Kingdom
mps house of commons uk
1918 establishments in the United Kingdom
Lists of women politicians
History of women in the United Kingdom